Seodaemun Station is a station on the Seoul Subway Line 5. It is named after one of the four great gates of the circular wall surrounding ancient Seoul.

Station layout

References

Metro stations in Jongno District
Seoul Metropolitan Subway stations
Railway stations opened in 1996